Pseudopezicula tracheiphila is a species of fungus in the family Helotiaceae that is found in Europe. It is a plant pathogen that affects grapes.

References

Fungi described in 1903
Fungi of Europe
Fungal grape diseases
Helotiaceae